The Master of Marketing Research (MMR) is a graduate degree program that may be from one to three years in length. Students pursuing this degree study the aspects of research in the field of marketing.  Unlike an M.B.A., which is a general business degree, the Master of Marketing Research focuses solely on the aspects of marketing research.

History 

The first Master of Marketing Research was developed by the Terry College of Business, University of Georgia in 1979.  Marketing faculty, together with leading marketing research professionals, developed a curriculum that "was designed to develop marketing research professionals of the highest caliber and thereby satisfy a critical need of U.S. business."

Master of Marketing Research degree 

Generally, a Master of Marketing Research combines classroom work with real-world research opportunities and special projects.  Courses stress practical application to real-world marketing research problems, rather than the theoretical application suggested in most bachelor's business degrees.

These degrees give specific instruction on research methodology, variable coding, and database construction and management.  Classroom topics might include database management, focus group development, statistics in marketing, and consumer behavior.

Different Program Titles 
The Master of Marketing Research (M.M.R) may also be known as the Master of Science in Marketing Research (M.S.M.R.), Master of Science in Marketing Analytics (M.S.M.A.).  Similar in nature to the Master of Marketing Research is a Master of Business Administration with an emphasis in marketing research. In Europe, the degree is known as Master in Market Research and Consumer Behavior at IE University/IE Business School and as Master of Marketing Analysis at Ghent University. In Canada, the degree is known as Master of Business-Marketing/Analysis.  In Australia, the degree is known as Master of Business in Marketing Research (M.B.M.R.) at Edith Cowan University, and as Master of Marketing (M.Mrkt.) at the University of Tasmania.

Curriculum
The curriculum of any Marketing Research program requires a student to complete the required prerequisites to accommodate the deficiency for non business background students. After that there are a series of core classes and electives. Some of the programs are lock step method programs following a particular sequence of series of courses lined up one after another. Other programs are open programs giving the students to chance to select their own courses. The courses are mainly divided into two genres: qualitative and quantitative.

Qualitative
Qualitative research consists of in-depth interviews famously called as IDI's as well as focus group. The qualitative research is mainly focus on cognitive and social psychology effect of marketing research. Understanding the thought process rather than analyzing it is the main priority of qualitative research.

Quantitative
Quantitative research mainly deals with application of bi-variate and multivariate statistics to marketing research. IBM SPSS is mostly widely used tool for data analysis though some companies would prefer to stay with excel and WinCross. Industrial application of statistics is limited to cross tabulations using Chi square estimation, but some companies do use linear and logistic regression analysis. More recently, Conjoint analysis is one of the new techniques that has become popular for its application on product bundling and pricing.

Quantitative research is applied to ad-hoc and tracking studies; it is mainly primary research with different studies (methods) and analysis techniques.

Type of Quantitative Studies
Concept testing, Copy testing, Customer experience study, Pricing study, Product testing, Brand awareness, Market segmentation, and Trade-off analysis

Quantitative Techniques
MaxDiff (Concept testing w/ monadic randomization), CSat & NPS score (Customer experience study), Van Westendorp pricing (Pricing study), Conjoint analysis (CBC) (Trade-off analysis), & Two-step cluster & K-means cluster analysis (Market segmentation)

Advanced Data Analysis Techniques (Not to get confused with data analytics)
Driver analysis (Linear regression), Factor analysis (EFA), and Perceptual mapping

Recent trends affecting marketing research education 
Job specialization is one of the recent trends affecting marketing research education.
There is evidence that modern professional jobs are rapidly being disaggregated  and becoming increasingly specialized. While management of the marketing mix will continue to be overseen by generalists broadly trained in business and/or marketing, this trend towards specialization is creating new opportunities for professionals with focal training in the area of market research and the closely related area of consumer behaviour. The current and future job prospects for these market research specialists are highly attractive.  For example, in the United States by 2018 jobs in Market and Survey Research are expected to grow to 350,500 as compared to 197,500 jobs for Marketing Managers, 43,900 jobs for Advertising and Promotion Managers and 64,100 jobs for Public Relations Managers.  These two trends—specialization of professional jobs, and high demand in the labor market for market research specialists—suggest an increasing importance for post-graduate training designed to provide a gateway for university graduates seeking to pursue careers in the areas of market research and consumer behavior.

Consumer Behavior Research by behavioral and neural scientists continue to make large contributions to our understanding of human decision making, and their findings are exerting a strong influence on the nature of marketing and market research.  As companies struggle in a new world of "big data" and social media such as Twitter and Facebook, companies are facing increasing challenges in collecting, analyzing and interpreting this data to better understand their customers. This suggests that consumer behavior and Customer insight will likely play an increasing role in the work of market researchers.

Careers in marketing research 
Careers in marketing research are divided mainly into two types supplier organization and client organization. Supplier side jobs are purely consulting jobs which are very similar in nature with management consulting jobs. Nielsen Corporation formerly known as AC Nielsen is the biggest supplier in the business followed by Kantar Group, Ipsos, GfK etc.

Supplier organization 
Supplier organization is multiple domain organization where MR graduates focus on multiple domains of industry. Depending upon the client requirements research is designed and executed. Most of the MR graduates work as statistician, analyst, account executive, field work director etc. Supplier organization work in similar nature to that of management consulting.

Client organization 
Client organization  single domain organization where MR graduate focuses completely on a single domain of industry. The various organizations which recruit MR graduates are in the domain of telecom, food processing, aviation, retail chain, media etc. The positions for which they recruit are director, assistant research director, senior analyst, analyst etc. Many supplier side consultants seek full-time employment with the clients they advise during their tenure in the supplier organization.

Job & Placements Scenarios 
With the increase in demand of marketing researchers there has been a surge in number of jobs available in research. Increasing number of suppliers have also increased the number of positions available in market. Most placements take place through alumni networks which benefits the graduate candidates to secure job before graduation. Most companies do recruit US citizens, but very few recruit international candidate due to visa sponsorship conditions. Other reasons would be qualitative work in research and abundance of available resources for recruitment.  International candidate is required to evaluate all criteria's and information before embarking on tenure for the graduate program. Prospective international candidates should take the initiative to talk to program director regarding international student placement before enrolling into the program. A list of number of international students enrollments and international students placements would be helpful to evaluate the strength of the program.

Certifications

Professional Certified Marketer (PCM) 

Professional Certified Marketer (PCM) is a certification offered by American Marketing Association (AMA) . AMA is an American organization based in Chicago, Illinois. It is considered as a credential which symbolizes mastery of marketing knowledge and commitment to quality in the practice of marketing. The certification requires a candidate to pass comprehensive exam. The certification is required to be renewed every three years through continuing education.

Professional Researcher Certification (PRC) 

Professional Researcher Certification (PRC) is a certification offered by Marketing Research Association (MRA) . MRA is an American organization based in Washington, DC. It tests a candidate's knowledge of current marketing research practices and understanding of marketing research issues. The certification requires a candidate to pass 100 multiple-choice and true/false questions exam. The certification is required to be renewed every two years through continuing education.

Master Moderator Certificate Program  (MMCP) 

The RIVA Master Moderator Certificate  is a certification offered by the RIVA Market Research and Training Institute, based in Rockville, MD.  The certificate is awarded to those who complete training in a series of courses, workshops, and private work in addition to demonstrating their skills and knowledge before an objective examination panel, through written and practicum examinations as well as personal interview. To qualify, candidates must have conducted a minimum of 200 qualitative research events (QREs) such as focus groups, in-depth interviews, ethnographies/in-home interviews, online bulletin boards/focus groups, etc. and pass the RIVA Master Moderator Certificate  written examination and practicum.

Programs of US

The University of Georgia: MMR Program 
Started in 1979, MMR program at the University of Georgia is the first marketing research program in the US. It has an 11-month cohort program which starts every summer (June) and ends in May. A total of 39 credit hours are required to complete the program. Being a cohort program it has a lock-step sequence of courses which are enrolled by the whole incoming class at the same time because of which the incoming class starts and graduates at the same time. Till date the program has a record of 100% placement for both domestic (US). Funding is provided in two forms: graduate assistantships, which include a full tuition waiver and monthly stipend, and out-of-state tuition waivers. The program accepts both GMAT and GRE score, and the class size is restricted to 30. The University of Georgia is a Tier 1 institution per U.S. News & World Report.

University of Wisconsin: MBA-MR Program 
University of Wisconsin at Madison offers a premier specialization in marketing research in their MBA program. The specialization in marketing is supported by A.C. Nielsen center for marketing research, which was founded in 1990 as a part of the business school. The program has only fall entry and follows the general full-time MBA application cycle. The program provides internship as an integral part with 100% internship placement rate. To date the program has 94% full-time placement rate.

The University of Texas at Arlington: MSMR Program 
MSMR program at The University of Texas at Arlington was founded in 1990. The program has strong connections with corporations in the Southwest with major presence in Dallas-Fort Worth area. The program is one of the original first three. It has a 24-month cohort program which has a flexible sequence of courses with multiple choices of electives. Each candidate is given an option to select courses as per his requirement. The program has reserved funding for MSMR students; funding includes graduate teaching assistantships which cover only out-of-state tuition and pay a monthly stipend.

University of Maryland-College Park: MS and PhD - Survey Methodology Program 
The Joint Program in Survey Methodology (JPSM) is the nation's oldest and largest program offering graduate training in the principles and practices of survey research. Founded in 1993, it is sponsored by the Federal Interagency Consortium on Statistical Policy and is housed in The College of Behavioral and Social Sciences at the University of Maryland.

Michigan State University: MSMR Program 
Founded in 2011, the MSMR program at Michigan State University is the only program in big four which has dual format. The full-time program is a 12-month program with required internship, while the online program is a 19-month program. There are no scholarships (funding) for students for this program and this information is provided in the FAQ section of the program. Also, the full-time program has a spring and fall entry. Recently, the program has shown strong development with respect to making strong connections and placements in the industry.

Southern Illinois University Edwardsville: MMR Program 
Founded in 1986 by Dr. Madhav Segal, SIUE's MMR program is one of the pioneers of higher education in the marketing research profession, and stands as one of the few such specialized graduate programs nationwide.  The program recognizes that it has responsibilities to the profession, to the community, and most of all, to ambitious students who are passionate about marketing research.  The program is supported by a group of committed internship sponsors made up of marketing research suppliers and clients alike, who offer students financial aid including a monthly stipend in exchange for working 20 hours per week in the company, gaining real world marketing research experience.  Graduates of SIUE's MMR program have gone on to successful research careers in companies such as Anheuser-Busch InBev, ConAgra Foods, Nielsen, Kynetec, just to name a few.  The program is a full-time traditional program that is completed by most students in 12–16 months. 95% of students enrolled in the MMR program at SIUE receive significant financial aid including full tuition waivers. SIUE consistently reports a 100% job placement rate for graduates of the program within 3 months of graduation.

Schools offering Masters in Marketing Research (or equivalent)

Europe 
 Aston University - Birmingham, England
 Ghent University - Ghent, Belgium
 IE University / IE Business School, Madrid, Spain
 Tilburg University - Tilburg, Netherlands
 James I University - Castellón de la Plana, Spain
 University of Edinburgh - Edinburgh, UK
 University of Barcelona - Barcelona, Spain

USA: Marketing Research Programs (MMR & MSMR)
University of Wisconsin - Madison, Wisconsin
Southern Illinois University Edwardsville - Edwardsville, Illinois
 Michigan State University- East Lansing, Michigan
 University of Georgia - Athens, Georgia
 The University of Texas at Arlington - Arlington, Texas
 Hofstra University - Hempstead, New York
 Temple University - Philadelphia, Pennsylvania
 Pacific Lutheran University - Tacoma, Washington

USA: Marketing/ Customer Analytics Programs
 Bentley University, Waltham, Massachusetts
 DePaul University - Chicago, Illinois
 University of Maryland -College Park, Maryland
 Illinois Institute of Technology -Chicago, Illinois
 Pace University -New York City, New York
 Washington University in St. Louis -St. Louis, Missouri
 Fordham University -New York City, New York
 University of Rochester -Rochester, New York
 Aurora University -Aurora, Illinois
 Michigan State University- East Lansing, Michigan
 Southern New Hampshire University -Manchester, New Hampshire

USA: MBA with concentration Marketing Research/ Intelligence/ Analytics Programs 
 University of Wisconsin- Madison, Wisconsin
 University of Texas- Austin, Texas
 Rutgers- Newark, New Jersey 
 Rochester Institute of Technology- Rochester, New York
 University of Connecticut- Storrs, Connecticut

USA: Special Graduate Programs Related to Marketing Research 
 Cuny Baruch College- New York City, New York
 University of Connecticut- Storrs, Connecticut
 University of Nebraska- Lincoln, Nebraska
 University of Michigan- Ann Arbor, Michigan
 University of Maryland- College Park, Maryland
 The University of Texas at Dallas- Richardson, Texas

Canada 
 University of Guelph- Ontario, Canada

See also 
 Macromarketing
 Marketing Research
 Marketing
 Consumer Behaviour
 Customer insight
 Academic degree
 Qualitative marketing research
 Quantitative marketing research

References

External links 
http://www.insightsassociation.org/

Marketing Research
Marketing research